"Lady Willpower" is a song written by Jerry Fuller and recorded by Gary Puckett & The Union Gap for their 1968 album Incredible.  The single was awarded a million-selling Gold disc from the RIAA.

Chart performance
In the U.S., the song ranked among Cashboxs Top 100 singles of 1968, where it hit the No. 1 position the week ending August 3, 1968.
"Lady Willpower" went No. 2 on the Billboard Hot 100 in 1968 (behind "Grazing in the Grass" by Hugh Masekela). and reached No. 26 on the Easy Listening chart. The song was the No. 34 song on the Billboard Year-End Hot 100 singles in 1968.
Outside the US, "Lady Willpower" reached No. 5 on the UK Singles Chart during the year.
"Lady Willpower" also peaked at #4 on the Kent Music Report (KMR) Chart in Australia, spending 16  weeks on the KMR Top-100 after entering the chart on the 22nd Jun 1968.

Other versions
Morrissey recorded his version of the song and included it on his 2019 album, California Son.

References

1968 singles
1968 songs
Gary Puckett & The Union Gap songs
Songs written by Jerry Fuller
Columbia Records singles
Cashbox number-one singles